Dato may refer to:
 Dato, a variant of Datuk, a traditional Malay honorific title
 Dato (newspaper), a Danish newspaper
 Eduardo Dato e Iradier, Spanish politician
 Dato Khujadze, also known as Dato, Georgian pop singer
 Dato, Greece, a village near Kavala, Greece
 Luis Dato, a 20th-century romantic Filipino poet